Nexus Television is a Bangladeshi Bengali-language satellite and cable infotainment television channel owned by S. Alam Group of Industries. It was launched on 30 July 2021 as the country's first non-fiction infotainment television channel. Unlike other television channels in Bangladesh, the channel does not air drama, movies, and news programming.

History 
In November 2013, Nexus Television was initially licensed by the Bangladesh Telecommunication Regulatory Commission as Rangdhanu Television. After receiving a frequency allocation to broadcast in January 2015, it began experimental broadcasts using that name in December 2019 via the Bangabandhu-1 satellite, which went for twenty-four hours a day. It had also originally planned to commence transmissions by the next few months. Later, Rangdhanu Television was renamed to its current name in 2020.

Nexus Television officially began broadcasting on 30 July 2021 at 18:00 (BST), with the "Jiboner Bondhon" (জীবনের বন্ধন) slogan. In its launch, Bangladesh's Minister of Information, Hasan Mahmud, has stated that the channel will play an important role in building Bangabandhu's dream of a golden Bengal under prime minister Sheikh Hasina.

Nexus Television was the broadcasting partner of the 2020 Anannya Top Ten Awards, held on 28 December 2021. During the International Women's Day on 8 March 2022, Nexus Television organized the 'Women Entrepreneur Fair' held for two days in its headquarters in Gulshan, and was broadcast live on the channel.

Programming 
As an infotainment television channel, Nexus Television mainly consists of documentaries, programming regarding current affairs, empowerment of women, the struggle of Bangladeshis, the prosperity of the country, the youth, and many more.

List of programming 
 Ai Amar Bangladesh
 Amar Ghor
 Amar Social Media
 Bizweek
 Daniel's Show
 Darai Nijer Paye
 Family Kitchen Show
 Harir Khobor
 Internet Dunia
 Islami Jibon Bidhan
 Kemon Achen
 Kontho Charo Jore
 Ladies Club
 Nondito Nirman
 SatDin
 Sports Academy
 Star Mom
 The Industry
 Tumi Prothom

References

External links 
 
 Official Facebook Page

Television in Bangladesh
Television channels in Bangladesh
2021 establishments in Bangladesh
Television channels and stations established in 2021